Shaffik Abdul Rahman (born 14 July 1984) is a Malaysian footballer lastly playing for Negeri Sembilan FA in Malaysia Super League.  He was born in Johor.

External links
 

Living people
1984 births
Malaysian footballers
People from Johor
Association football wingers
Negeri Sembilan FA players